The 1969 Davidson Wildcats football team was an American football team that represented Davidson College in the Southern Conference (SoCon) during the 1969 NCAA University Division football season. In their fifth season under head coach Homer Smith, the Wildcats compiled a 7–4 record (5–1 against conference opponents), won the conference championship, and lost to Toledo in the 1969 Tangerine Bowl.

Schedule

References

Davidson
Davidson Wildcats football seasons
Southern Conference football champion seasons
Davidson Wildcats football